Watson Bluff is a dark bluff 225 m, at the east end of David Island. Discovered by the Australasian Antarctic Expedition, 1911–14, under Mawson, and named for Andrew D. Watson, geologist with the expedition.

References

Cliffs of Antarctica
Landforms of Queen Mary Land